Strand district could refer to:

Strand, London, a road and area in London, England
Strand District (Metropolis), a historic local government district in London, England
Strand (UK Parliament constituency), historic constituency in London, England
Strand Historic District, United States